David O'Donoghue (born 1952) is an Irish journalist and historian who has written two books on Irish-German relations during the Second World War. He has also worked as a journalist for RTÉ and for Agence France-Presse in Paris. He has a PhD from Dublin City University.

Selected publications
 The Irish Army in the Congo 1960-1964: The Far Battalions. Dublin, 2005.
 "Army's Congo Mission Casts a Long Shadow", Irish Studies in International Affairs, Vol. 17 (2006), pp. 43–59. 
 The Devil’s Deal: The IRA, Nazi Germany and the double life of Jim O’Donovan. Dublin, 2010.
 Hitler's Irish Voices: The story of German radio's wartime Irish service. Dromore: Somerville Press, Dromore, 2014.

References

External links 
https://www.researchgate.net/publication/307803755_Nazis_on_the_State_Payroll_in_1930s_Ireland

Living people
1952 births
Irish journalists
20th-century Irish historians
21st-century Irish historians
Agence France-Presse journalists
RTÉ newsreaders and journalists
Alumni of Dublin City University